Shankland is a surname. Notable people with the surname are:
Alfred Shankland (1877–1952), Dean of Barbados from 1917 to 1938
Andy Shankland (born 1964), English football (soccer) player
Bill Shankland (1907–1998), Australian rugby league footballer and golfer
Graeme Shankland, (1917-84), English town planner
Katrina Shankland (born 1987), American community organizer and politician
Lawrence Shankland (born 1995), Scottish football (soccer) player
Leith Shankland (born 1991), South African swimmer
Mark Shankland, Scottish football (soccer) player
Robert Shankland (1887–1968), Canadian Victoria Cross recipient
Robert S. Shankland (1908–1982), American physicist and historian
Sam Shankland (born 1991), American chess grandmaster
Warren Shankland, South African cricketer
William Shankland Andrews (1858–1936), American lawyer

Surnames
English-language surnames
Surnames of British Isles origin
Surnames of English origin
Surnames of Scottish origin
Surnames of Welsh origin